Somerset Township is one of the sixteen townships of Belmont County, Ohio, United States. The 2010 census found 1,245 people in the township.

Geography
Located in the southwestern corner of the county, it borders the following townships:
Warren Township - north
Goshen Township - northeast corner
Wayne Township - east
Malaga Township, Monroe County - south
Seneca Township, Monroe County - southwest
Beaver Township, Noble County - west
Millwood Township, Guernsey County - northwest

No municipalities are located in Somerset Township.

Name and history
It is the only Somerset Township statewide.

Government
The township is governed by a three-member board of trustees, who are elected in November of odd-numbered years to a four-year term beginning on the following January 1. Two are elected in the year after the presidential election and one is elected in the year before it. There is also an elected township fiscal officer, who serves a four-year term beginning on April 1 of the year after the election, which is held in November of the year before the presidential election. Vacancies in the fiscal officership or on the board of trustees are filled by the remaining trustees.

References

External links
County website

Townships in Belmont County, Ohio
Townships in Ohio